"That's The Way Love Ought to Be" is a song by Pittsburgh rock musician Donnie Iris. It originally appeared on his second album, King Cool, released in 1981. Even though it was never released as a single, it is still considered to be one of classics from his years at MCA Records (1980-83).

Album appearances 
 King Cool, 1981
 Out of the Blue, 1992
 Live! At Nick's Fat City, 1998 (live)
 20th Century Masters: The Millennium Collection: The Best of Donnie Iris, 2001

1981 songs
Donnie Iris songs
Songs written by Mark Avsec
Songs written by Donnie Iris
MCA Records singles